Enneapterygius ziegleri, known commonly as the Ziegler's triplefin, is a species of triplefin blenny in the genus Enneapterygius. It was described by Ronald Fricke in 1994. Its specific name honours Bernhard Ziegler (1929-2013), a paleontologist and Director of the State Museum of Natural History in Stuttgart, Germany. This species occurs in the Timor Sea of Indonesia and East Timor and in the Philippines.

References

ziegleri
Fish described in 1994